Olivier Py (born 24 July 1965 in Grasse, Alpes-Maritimes) is a French stage director, actor and writer.

Career
In 1997, Py became director of the Centre dramatique national d'Orléans. In 2007, he became director of the Théâtre de l'Odéon in Paris.

Py describes himself as Catholic and homosexual. He is known for his emphasis on Catholic and homoerotic themes.

Since the early 2000s, Py has increasingly devoted himself to the opera. His productions of La damnation de Faust, Tannhäuser and Tristan und Isolde, all in Geneva, have generally been well received. In March 2008, he debuted at the Paris Opéra. On this occasion he stated to a French magazine (Diapason, March 2008) that he "would not be done staging operas until [he] did Wagner's Ring and Parsifal".

Theatre

Works written and directed
 1988: Des oranges et des ongles
 1990: Gaspacho, un chien mort
 1991: La femme canon et le bouquet final
 1992: Les Aventures de Paco Goliard
 1992: La Nuit au cirque
 1992: La chèvre
 1994: La Jeune fille, le diable et le moulin
 1995: La Servante – histoire sans fin
 1996: Apologétique
 1997: Le Visage d'Orphée
 1998: Requiem pour Srebrenica
 1999: L'Eau de la vie
 2000: Le Cabaret de Miss Knife
 2000: L'apocalypse joyeuse
 2001: Au monde comme n'y étant pas
 2001: L'Exaltation du labyrinthe
 2001: Épître aux jeunes acteurs pour que soit rendue la parole à la parole
 2003: Jeunesse
 2004: Le Vase de parfums, opera libretto
 2004: Faust Nocturne
 2004: Miss Knife chante Olivier Py
 2005: Les Vainqueurs
 2006: Illusions Comiques
 2011: Romeo et Juliette (Shakespeare), at Theatre de l'Odeon
 2011: Die Sonne (Le Soleil), Volksbühne Berlin, Berlin, Germany

Published works
 1994: La Jeune fille, le diable et le moulin, L'école des loisirs
 1998: Théâtre, Solitaires Intempestifs
 2005: Les Vainqueurs, Actes Sud
 2007: Les Enfants de Saturne

Other productions
 1989: Mon Père qui fonctionnait par périodes culinaires et autres
 1996: Miss Knife et sa baraque chantante, Festival d'Avignon
 1993: Les Drôles (Élizabeth Mazev)
 1999: Der Freischütz (Carl Maria von Weber), Opéra de Nancy
 2001: Les Contes d'Hoffmann (Jacques Offenbach), Grand Théâtre de Genève
 2003: La damnation de Faust (Hector Berlioz), Geneva
 2003: Le Soulier de satin (Paul Claudel), Orléans
 2005: Tristan und Isolde (Richard Wagner, Geneva
 2005: Tannhäuser (Richard Wagner), Geneva
 2006: A Cry from Heaven (Vincent Woods)
 2006: Curlew River (Benjamin Britten)
 2008: The Rake's Progress (Igor Stravinsky), Opéra National de Paris (Palais Garnier)
 2008: La Trilogie du Diable: La Damnation de Faust (Hector Berlioz), Der Freischütz (Carl Maria von Weber), Les Contes d'Hoffmann (Jacques Offenbach).  Grand Théâtre de Genève
 2017: Mam'zelle Nitouche – in which he appeared as an actor/singer, touring until 2019 
 2018: Lohengrin (Richard Wagner), La Monnaie, Brussels; 2022 Opera Australia

Movies

Actor
 1989: Dis-moi oui, dis-moi non (short) directed by Noémie Lvovsky
 1995: Funny Bones directed by Peter Chelsom
 1995: Au petit Marguery directed by Laurent Bénégui
 1995: 75 centilitres de prière (short) directed by Jacques Maillot
 1995: Corps inflammables (short) directed by Jacques Maillot
 1996: Casse-casse partie (TV) directed by Gérard Renouf
 1996: Chacun cherche son chat directed by Cédric Klapisch
 1997: La Divine poursuite directed by Michel Deville
 1998: Late August, Early September
 1999: Peut-être directed by Cédric Klapisch
 1999: Nos vies heureuses directed by Jacques Maillot
 2000: Les Yeux fermés (TV) directed by Olivier Py

References

External links 

 
 Interview (in French) about opera on Odb-opera.com
 "En violet, le Festival d’Avignon mêle les genres", Le Monde, 29 March 2018
 Langlais, Pierre (2007). "Olivier Py or the religion of the theatre", Label France No. 66. 

1965 births
Living people
People from Grasse
French male film actors
French Roman Catholics
French theatre directors
French theatre managers and producers
French opera directors
French gay writers
LGBT Roman Catholics
French LGBT dramatists and playwrights
French National Academy of Dramatic Arts alumni
Male dramatists and playwrights